Bernd Schünemann (born 1 November 1944) is a German jurist and legal philosopher. A student of Claus Roxin, he earned his doctorate and habilitation in penal law in 1971 and 1975 respectively.

Schünemann is a prolific legal scholar and served as a consultant for the Bundestag and other organizations. His work is especially known in Latin America and East Asia and he earned six honorary doctorates from universities around the world.

References 

1944 births
Academic staff of the Ludwig Maximilian University of Munich
Members of the Bavarian Academy of Sciences
20th-century jurists
German jurists
German legal scholars
Living people